Persatuan Sepak Bola Indragiri Hilir, commonly known as Persih Tembilahan, or Persih, is an Indonesian football club based in Tembilahan, Indragiri Hilir Regency, Riau. They are competing in Liga 3 and use Beringin Stadium as their home ground. Now Persih Merangin Jambi

History
Persih this as a debutant team that was lucky, because it began competing in Division III in 2005 and every year the competition successful promotion. Persih finally play in Division I in 2007, and entered the Premier Division in 2008.

This success is inseparable from the hard work of Mr. Indra Muchlis Adnan Regent of Indragiri Hilir Regency along with branch manager Indragiri Hilir in garnering strength for Persih Tembilahan keep moving forward and become a promotional tool for this region a thousand trenches.

References

External links
Persih Tembilahan at Liga-Indonesia.co.id

 
Football clubs in Indonesia
Football clubs in Riau
1970 establishments in Indonesia
Association football clubs established in 1970